Stefania Wolicka (1851–1937) was a Polish historian and the first woman awarded a Doctorate of Philosophy at the University of Zurich (in 1875).

Biography
Wolicka, born in Warsaw (which from 1867 was within the Russian Empire) pursued her history degree despite the efforts of the Russian government of the time to prevent women from pursuing higher education. In 1873 she defied a decree ordering Russian women studying abroad to abandon their studies. Wolicka elected to continue her studies after her request for an exemption from the decree was denied. She petitioned the Minister of Education, Dmitry Tolstoy, directly, without success. The Russian government achieved the expulsion of several women students in Zurich, due to the political threat it saw in radical socialist activists called the "Fritschi Circle" (named after their Zurich landlady, Frau Fritsch). Some were put on trial in Russia, during the Trial of Fifty in 1877, leading to convictions and imprisonment for several. There is no evidence that Wolicka was ever part of this circle, and recent research indicates that some students in Zurich were listed as revolutionaries by the government based solely on the fact that they had attended university in Switzerland during the period 1872–73. However, Wolicka's name was on a list of 45 female Russian students sent to Tolstoy, who were all banned from teaching in the Russian Empire, forcing them to leave Switzerland by January 1, 1874.

According to University of Zurich records, Wolicka was from Posen (Poznań), and was born in Warsaw, and while she attended the University of Zurich, her parents were living in Zurich. Despite being forced to leave Switzerland, she received her Doctor of Philosophy degree in 1875. Her doctoral dissertation is titled "Griechische Frauengestalten, 1.Teil"  (Greek Figures of Women, Part 1). She has been called one of the "first Polish female academicians". Hulewicz noted that she belongs to the first generation of Polish female students, a generation that was composed "primarily of heroic individuals".

Wolicka married, and became known by the name Stefania Wolicka-Arnd. Her doctoral dissertation was published in 1875 by Zürcher und Furrer in Zurich. She became a noted writer on women's rights in Poland. In 1895, she published an article in the Polish law journal Athenæum titled "Twenty five years of the parliamentary struggle for the rights of women".

Wolicka was the first woman to earn a Doctorate of Philosophy degree in Europe in the modern era. The first woman known to receive a Doctorate of Philosophy degree in Europe is believed to be Elena Cornaro, who received the degree at the University of Padua in 1678. Universities in Switzerland were the first modern-era European universities to admit female students. Women scholars from Poland, Austria, Belgium, and other parts of Europe relocated to Switzerland in the late 19th century to enroll in university, such as Belgium's first female university graduate, physician Isala Van Diest.

Bibliography

References

19th-century Polish historians
Polish feminists
1851 births
1937 deaths
University of Zurich alumni
19th-century Polish women writers
20th-century Polish women writers
Polish women historians